The Dungkhag Court (sub-district court) is the court of first instance of the Royal Court of Justice in 6 of the 20 Dzongkhags of Bhutan which have Dungkhag administrative divisions; in the remaining 14 Dzongkhags, the Dzongkhag Court is the court of first instance. There are a total of 13 Dungkhags (sub-districts) in the 6 Dzongkhags (districts) that contain them. Like the members of the Dzongkhag Court, the judges of the Dungkhag Court are not appointed by the Druk Gyalpo under the 2008 Constitution.

See also
Supreme Court of Bhutan
High Court of Bhutan
Dzongkhag Court
Constitution of Bhutan
Politics of Bhutan
Judicial system of Bhutan
Judiciary

References

External links

Judiciary of Bhutan